Souverain was a 74-gun ship of the line of the French Navy, lead ship of her class.

She took part in the Battle of the Chesapeake, in 1781. In 1792, she was renamed Peuple Souverain ("Sovereign People").

In 1798, she took part in the battle of the Nile. She was subsequently recommissioned in the Royal Navy as HMS Guerrier, but was in too bad a shape to serve in the high sea, so she was used as a guard ship.

Citations

Sources

External links 
 HMS Guerrier 

Ships of the line of the French Navy
Souverain-class ships of the line
1757 ships
Captured ships